The Cinematic Orchestra is a British nu jazz and downtempo music group created in 1999 by Jason Swinscoe. The group is signed to independent record label Ninja Tune.

The Cinematic Orchestra have produced four studio albums, Motion (1999), Every Day (2002), Ma Fleur (2007) and To Believe (2019), and two film soundtrack albums, Man with a Movie Camera (2003) and The Crimson Wing: Mystery of the Flamingos (2009).

In addition to Swinscoe, the band includes former DJ Food member PC (Patrick Carpenter) on turntables, Luke Flowers on drums, Tom Chant on saxophone, Nick Ramm on piano, Stuart McCallum on guitar, and Phil France on double bass. Former members include Jamie Coleman (trumpet), T. Daniel Howard (drums), Federico Ughi (drums), Alex James (piano), and Clean Sadness (synthesizer, programming).

Swinscoe and Carpenter have also recorded together under the band name Neptune.

Style
The Cinematic Orchestra's sound, in both live and studio contexts, employs a live band which improvises along with a turntablist and electronic elements such as samples provided by Swinscoe. In their studio releases Swinscoe will often remix the live source material to produce a combination of live jazz improvisation with electronica, such that it is difficult to tell where the improvisation ends and the production begins.

History
Swinscoe first formed a group called Crabladder in 1990, whilst studying Fine Art at Cardiff College, releasing one official single on his own Power Tools label. In 1994, Swinscoe was given a DJ spot on Heart FM, a pirate radio station in south London.

The Cinematic Orchestra's debut album, Motion, was released in 1999. The critical success of that album led to them being asked to perform at the Director's Guild Awards ceremony for the presentation of the Lifetime Achievement Award to film director Stanley Kubrick.

The band were asked by the organisers of the Porto European City of Culture 2001 festival to write a new score to Dziga Vertov's classic 1929 Soviet Union film Man with a Movie Camera, to be performed live in accompaniment with a showing of the silent film. The work differed from the band's usual compositions due to its live performance, ruling out the post production work that was present on Motion. The Cinematic Orchestra toured the work and later released it as an album. Many of the compositions originally created for that album, Man with a Movie Camera, were later adapted from live form (adding in vocal tracks and electronic elements, among other changes) for their next album, Every Day. It reached #54 in the UK Albums Chart in May 2002.

In 2006, the Cinematic Orchestra created a cover version of Radiohead's "Exit Music (For a Film)" that appeared on an album titled Exit Music: Songs with Radio Heads. In this piece the band slowed down the tempo of the original, divided the timbre into four sections beginning with saxophone, to the classical guitar, to the electric guitar, ending the piece with the same simple acoustic guitar rhythm as the original.

The Cinematic Orchestra released the album Ma Fleur in May 2007. Several songs feature Patrick Watson, Fontella Bass, or Lou Rhodes on vocals, with Rhodes and Watson sharing vocals on one song.

The Cinematic Orchestra recorded the soundtrack to the Disneynature film The Crimson Wing: Mystery of the Flamingos, released in France in December 2008 (originally as Les ailes pourpres: Le mystère des flamants). The score was produced by the band and Steve McLaughlin. The score was performed live with the London Metropolitan Orchestra at Union Chapel, Islington in September 2009 and won the award for Best Original Score for a Documentary Film at the Jackson Hole Wildlife Film Festival in Wyoming, USA in October 2009.

Ninja Tune invited the Cinematic Orchestra to perform at the twentieth anniversary gala performance of the label at the Royal Albert Hall in November 2010.

In 2011, the Cinematic Orchestra commissioned a series of compositions for avant-garde short films that were performed at the Barbican Centre under the auspices of its curating a series entitled "In Motion" (also featuring Dorian Concept with saxophonist Tom Chant, Grey Reverend, and Austin Peralta). It subsequently released the album In Motion #1 in 2012.

In 2015, they created their own version of Melanie De Biasio’s track "I’m Gonna Leave You" for the album Gilles Peterson presents - No Deal Remixed.

Their fourth studio album, To Believe, was released in March 2019.

Song appearances
"To Build a Home", from the album Ma Fleur and featuring the vocals of the Canadian singer-songwriter Patrick Watson, has been used extensively in film and television. In 2008, the song was used for the Chivas Regal Live with Chivalry advertisement. It was used for Sam "OB" O'Brien's departure in a 2008 episode of the British soap Hollyoaks. It has been featured in the films Trinidad, The Tree, "Polytechnique", and the 2011 shorts Rapha Continental and This Is Brighton. The song had also been used for episodes of jPod, Friday Night Lights, Grey's Anatomy, One Tree Hill, Criminal Minds, Packed to the Rafters, Ugly Betty, On Thin Ice, Suits, Top Gear, Orange Is the New Black, on the 2013 broadcast of Comic Relief, on Supersize vs Super Skinny, the Australian reality series The Block Sky High and on  The Big C. It was also featured in August 2013 for an extended trailer of the upcoming third series of Homeland on Showtime. It appeared in the 2009 documentary Ingredients: Who's Your Farmer? about the local food movement. The song's slow, melancholy melody provided an easy, smooth transition from the first half of the documentary to the next. In 2012, the song was used in a video named The Most Astounding Fact, in which science communicator Neil deGrasse Tyson answers a question posed by a Time magazine reader. The video was edited by freelance videographer Max Schlickenmeyer who posted it to YouTube, where it garnered more than 9 million views. In 2013, the song was used in an advertisement for Guinness featuring wheelchair basketballers. The song was also used in a UK advert for Sky Atlantic featuring Dustin Hoffman in front of a New York skyline. The advert was produced by WCRS.  It is featured in the concluding scene of the 2013 Vanessa Hudgens film Gimme Shelter. More recently, it appeared in the 2016 film The Edge of Seventeen, and the 2016 Ubisoft Annecy video game Steep. The 26 January 2016 episode of British soap EastEnders featured the song during the scenes following a serious bus accident. In 2017, the season five finale of Orange Is the New Black featured the song in its final scenes. In January 2018, the TV series This Is Us used the song during the ending of a second season episode. The song reappeared during the closing scene of a fourth season episode. It also featured in the documentary Best Wishes, Warmest Regards: A Schitt's Creek Farewell in 2020. It was also used in 2020 in a tribute video by the daughter of author Helen Harris, biographer of Edward Payson Weston.

A shorter version of the song "That Home", with a slightly different composition, has also been used on occasion, such as an episode of Teen Wolf, in an episode of Suits,
in the trailer for the 2011 Sundance award-winning film Another Earth and in the ABC drama Defying Gravity. It also featured in the seventh-season finale of the FOX dance competition So You Think You Can Dance. It was also featured in a trailer for the NBC drama Awake.  Most recently it was featured as one of the dance performance songs in the 2012 motion picture Step Up Revolution.

The Public Radio Exchange radio show This American Life often uses The Cinematic Orchestra song "Drunken Tune" from the album Man with a Movie Camera.

The final scene and closing credits of the 2006 film Kidulthood feature the song "All Things to All Men" from the album Every Day. An instrumental version of the song had previously been used in the British television drama Hustle. The song also featured on the British soap Hollyoaks in December 2009, and appears on Wonders of the Solar System briefly (Thin Blue Line), narrated by Professor Brian Cox.

Their songs "Burn Out" and "Flite" was featured in the 2012 video game Sleeping Dogs.

In December 2012, the song  "Arrival of the Birds" from the soundtrack for The Crimson Wing: Mystery of the Flamingos appears in a commercial for the women's perfume Acqua di Gioia by Giorgio Armani. The song also appears at the end of the 2014 film The Theory of Everything and in the short film Together Apart from the Cornetto Cupidity Series.

An excerpt near the 16 minute mark of the "In Motion #1" track "Entr'acte" was used in part two of Top Gear's Africa Special that originally aired on 10 March 2013.

The song closed the documentary Noma My Perfect Storm in 2015.

The second half of Manhatta was used in the closing sequence of the BBC's coverage of the UK general elections in 2015 and 2017.

The song "To Believe" was featured in the TV show Fear the Walking Dead (season 6) episode 8, "The Door".

The song "A Caged Bird/Imitations of Life (featuring Roots Manuva)" from the album To Believe, was featured in racing video game Need for Speed: Heat.

Discography

Studio albums

Soundtrack albums

Live albums

Remix albums

Mix albums

Other albums

Singles

References

External links
 – official site

The Cinematic Orchestra at Last.fm

The Cinematic Orchestra at Ninja Tune

Ninja Tune artists
Acid jazz musicians
English electronic music groups
English jazz ensembles
Musical groups established in 1999
Musical groups from London
Downtempo musicians
Nu jazz musicians
1999 establishments in England